The Silver Lake Railroad is a heritage railway located in Madison, New Hampshire, USA.

History 
Founded and owned by Neil Underwood, Silver Lake Railroad opened on July 7, 2007, operating from Madison Station (aka Silver Lake Depot) in the town of Madison. This station was a stop for the Boston and Maine Railroad from 1872 until passenger service ended on the line in 1961. The station has been restored over the period from 2002–2007, and much of its original features are intact.  The original order boards and stationmaster office were undisturbed, as well as the interior of the station (now housing the Silver Lake post office), which displays its original varnished woodwork. As of 2017, the railroad has ended it excursions and no longer does operations as they ran their last train that same year.

Equipment 
Silver Lake Railroad's rolling and display stock currently at the station:
 1917 H. K. Porter, Inc 0-4-0 steam engine
 Plymouth 24-ton locomotive
 Vulcan 10-ton locomotive
 30 inch gauge Plymouth locomotive
 Midsize Plymouth locomotive
 Fairmont A8 Gang Car
 Three Fairmont A6 gang cars (used for power cars)
 Fairmont S2 railcar
 Fairmont railcar converted to small trolley
 Three   open passenger cars
 Boston and Maine and Union Pacific baggage carts
 a 1941 Sterling Diner

Route 
The railroad operates on the historic Conway Branch (abandoned in October 1972), traveling northward past a chain of ponds in Madison, New Hampshire to a crossing south of Conway.  Rides are approximately 40 minutes, aboard two  open-air passenger cars powered by a Fairmont A6 railcar. The line passes a series of lily ponds and beaver ponds which have beaver lodges and dams in them.  Scenery includes the Mt. Washington Valley and views of the White Mountains.  Wildlife that can be seen along the line include but are not limited to moose, bears, deer, and birds.

Silver Lake Railroad's most previous run was in September of 2017. As of October of 2021, no plans exist to have it return.

See also 
 Miniature Train at Silver Lake (Ohio)

References 

Tom Eastman, "Silver Lake's Little Railroad That Can", The Conway Daily Sun, August 24, 2007

External links
 Silver Lake Railroad - official site

Heritage railroads in New Hampshire
Tourist attractions in Carroll County, New Hampshire
Transportation in Carroll County, New Hampshire